"The Story of a Broken Heart" (or "Story of a Broken Heart") is a song originally recorded by Johnny Cash. It was written for him by Tommy Blake or Sam Phillips.

The song was recorded by Cash at Sun Records in May 1958. and released as a single (Sun 343, with "Down the Street to 301" on the opposite side) in June 1960.

Background

Charts

References 

Johnny Cash songs
1960 singles
Sun Records singles
1960 songs